Woodman Light, also known as Woodman Point Lighthouse, Gage Roads Lighthouse and Coogee Lighthouse, is a lighthouse in Western Australia. Located on Woodman Point in the City of Cockburn, it has been in continuous operation since 1902. It is located on the highest point of land in the area, which is unusually far inland for a lighthouse. On the same block of land are two Federation Bungalow style keepers' cottage, also built of limestone.

The lighthouse is operated and maintained by the Fremantle Port Authority for the benefit of shipping approaching Fremantle Harbour. The lighthouse is a leading light with three sectors: green to the east, a bright (white) central sector and red to the west. Most Western Australian lighthouses were taken over by the Commonwealth in 1915. Because Woodman Point was not considered to be a 'coastal light' it remained under state control. 

The lighthouse is not open to the public. The keepers' cottages have not been used as such since the light was electrified in 1955; currently, they are used as private residences.

History

Originally known as Gage Roads Lighthouse, it provided a leading light for vessels heading to the Port of Fremantle. Previously shipping had relied on the lighthouses on Rottnest and Arthur Head to navigate to the port. The Arthur Head light was a fixed white light. Increasing development along the coast made it difficult for ships to distinguish the lighthouse from other lights. As an example, the voyage of the Stuttgart would have ended in tragedy had her captain not realised in time that he was not steering for the Arthur Head lighthouse, but a bright light on the Osborne Hotel in Claremont!

The need for a leading light was put to the government by the captains of various mail steamers. Construction of the Gage Roads Lighthouse commenced in October 1901. The tower and cottages were built by contractor  Rose under a Public Works Department tender for £2,383. It had a kerosene vapour lamp, and first order lens and lantern supplied by Messrs Chance Bros & Co., Smethwick, England, and an occulting timing pattern that hid the light for three seconds every 30 seconds. 

There is a widely circulating story that the red and green sector shades were incorrectly installed, that is, in the reverse order. Drawings from the Public Works Department that pre-date construction show that the sectors were installed as planned. The story is clearly an urban myth!

The lighthouse was officially opened on 23 August 1902 by the Minister for Public Works Hector Cornthwaite Rason. The opening was attended by a number of politicians and businessmen including the Colonial Treasurer James Gardiner; the Colonial Secretary, Walter Kingsmill; and the Mayor of Fremantle, Lawrence Alexander. 

The first lightkeeper was William Efford. He was transferred from the Arthur Head lighthouse which was extinguished when Woodman Point was lit. The first assistant keeper was John Lyons.

New condensing prisms were fitted in 1908. During World War II it was used by the army as a communications base and observations post, and was therefore placed under guard. In 1944 the clockwork mechanism controlling the occulting of the light was replaced, as the original was considered on the verge of failure. In the mid 1950s an additional green sector was added to the south-west. In 1955 the lighthouse was electrified at a cost of £1300. On 19 July of that year, the lighthouse was de-manned. The last lightkeeper was Laurence McBride; the last assistant keeper was Albert Livesey.

See also

 List of lighthouses in Australia

References

Woodman Light in the Gazetteer of Australia online

Lighthouses completed in 1902
State Register of Heritage Places in the City of Cockburn
Lighthouses in Western Australia